|}

The Prix de Flore is a Group 3 flat horse race in France open to thoroughbred fillies and mares aged three years or older. It is run at Saint-Cloud over a distance of 2,100 metres (about 1 mile and 2½ furlongs), and it is scheduled to take place each year in late October.

History
Despite being scheduled for the autumn, the event is named after Flora, a Roman goddess associated with spring. It was established in 1893, and was originally held at Maisons-Laffitte. It was initially restricted to three-year-olds and contested over 2,000 metres. It was extended to 2,100 metres in 1898.

The race reverted to 2,000 metres in 1913. It was abandoned throughout World War I, with no running from 1914 to 1918.

The event was switched to Saint-Cloud and increased to 2,100 metres in 1925. It was restored to 2,000 metres in 1935. A longer spell over 2,100 metres began in 1938.

The Prix de Flore was cancelled twice during World War II, in 1939 and 1940. It was staged at Longchamp in 1941 and 1942, Maisons-Laffitte in 1943, and Le Tremblay in 1944. It took place at Longchamp again in 1945 and 1954.

The present system of race grading was introduced in 1971, and the Prix de Flore was classed at Group 3 level. It was opened to older fillies and mares in 1981.

Records
Most successful horse:
 no horse has won this race more than once

Leading jockey (5 wins):
 Olivier Peslier – Oxava (1993), Tamise (1995), Palme d'Or (1997), Louve (1999), Audacieuse (2000)
 Christophe Soumillon – Miliana (2001), Visorama (2003), Si Luna (2015), Loving Things (2016)

Leading trainer (6 wins):
 André Fabre – Fly Me (1983), Sporades (1992), Tamise (1995), Palme d'Or (1997), Louve (1999), Visorama (2003)

Leading owner (8 wins):
 Marcel Boussac – Lasarte (1920), Durzetta (1921), Caravelle (1943), Damaka (1951), Airelle (1953), Phigalia (1959), Ydra (1964), Demia (1977)

Winners since 1979

Earlier winners

 1893: Mistress Gilly
 1894: Frida
 1895: Kasbah
 1896: Hero
 1897: Quilda
 1898: Melina
 1899: Sesara
 1900: Semendria
 1901: Lena
 1902: La Loreley
 1903: Rose de Mai
 1904: Profane
 1905: Luzerne
 1906: Arabie / Sais *
 1907: All Mine
 1908: Sauge Pourpree
 1909: Ronde de Nuit
 1910: La Francaise
 1911: La Boheme
 1912: Wagram
 1913: Trinqueuse
 1914–18: no race
 1919: Fausta
 1920: Lasarte
 1921: Durzetta
 1922: Lady Elinor
 1923: Concorde
 1924: Sweet Auburn
 1925: La Habanera
 1926: La Caporale
 1927: Lithography
 1928: Lilybee
 1929: Rollybuchy
 1930: Kill Lady
 1931: Campaspe
 1932: La Bourrasque
 1933: Revery
 1934: Rarity
 1935: Medea
 1936: La Pallarea
 1937: Solace
 1938: Feerie
 1939–40: no race
 1941: Dauphine
 1942: Guirlande
 1943: Caravelle
 1944: Oalgabla
 1945: Raita
 1946: Melibob
 1947: Folina
 1948: Phydile
 1949: La Belle Aventure
 1950: Polaire
 1951: Damaka
 1952: La Mirambule
 1953: Airelle
 1954: Toundra
 1955: Double Luck
 1956: Belle
 1957: Kalitka
 1958: La Touques
 1959: Phigalia
 1960: Free Moon
 1961: Grande Ligne
 1962:
 1963: Chicane
 1964: Ydra
 1965:
 1966: Solitude
 1967: Percale
 1968:
 1969: Friedensbotschaft
 1970: Chamade
 1971: Sega Ville
 1972: Siliciana
 1973: My Great Aunt
 1974: Ninfae
 1975: Lighted Glory
 1976: No No Nanette
 1977: Demia
 1978: North Sea

* The 1906 race was a dead-heat and has joint winners.

See also
 List of French flat horse races

References
 France Galop / Racing Post:
 , 
 france-galop.com – A Brief History: Prix de Flore.
 galopp-sieger.de – Prix de Flore.
 horseracingintfed.com – International Federation of Horseracing Authorities – Prix de Flore (2016).
 pedigreequery.com – Prix de Flore – Saint-Cloud.

Middle distance horse races for fillies and mares
Saint-Cloud Racecourse
Horse races in France
Recurring sporting events established in 1893